Hatiora salicornioides, the bottle cactus, dancing-bones, drunkard's-dream, or spice cactus, is a species of flowering plant in the cactus family. A member of the tribe Rhipsalideae, it often grows as an epiphyte. It is native to eastern Brazil. It is sometimes grown both indoors and outdoors as an ornamental.

Description
Each segment is shaped like a club or bottle, with the narrower end at the base. The stems branch from the end of a segment, with up to six branches forming a whorl. Translucent white berries follow the flowers.

Taxonomy
The species was first described by Adrian H. Haworth in 1819, as Rhipsalis salicornioides. Haworth had actually spelt the epithet "salicornoides"; subsequent authors have corrected the spelling, treating the original as an orthographic error. However, the International Plant Names Index has since noted that the specific epithet is not correctable to "salicornioides" as is it derived from a noun and a suffix, and not two Greek or Latin words. The epithet means "similar to Salicornia". The species was placed under the genus Hatiora in 1915, after previously belonging to the “lost” (and ultimately, abandoned) genus of Hariota. Molecular phylogenetic studies have confirmed its placement in the correct genus, and also in the tribe Rhipsalideae, showing a close relation to H. cylindrica (which has been considered synonymous with H. salicornioides, as a cultivar/form or variety). H. salicornioides is highly variable, as many succulent plants can be, and may possibly include other distinct species.

Distribution and habitat
Hatiora salicornioides is found slightly inland of the oceanic coastal regions of Brazil, in states that are the nearest to the Atlantic Ocean, although it is not typically found directly at sea level. This home range encompasses most of the eastern, northeastern, southeastern, and southern areas of Brazil’s lengthy coastline. States and regions where these plants are known to be found include Bahia, Espírito Santo, Minas Gerais, Rio de Janeiro state,  São Paulo state and Paraná, in the south. This vast (and fragile) stretch of land contains dense and relatively still-in-tact forest habitats, burgeoning with endemic flora and fauna. The high rate of growth and large number of unique plants is attributed to the generally constant year-round temperatures, combined with high ambient humidity (of the rivers, fog, and dew, in addition to regular rain showers/storms). In these jungles, the limbs of trees are some of the best places to find these epiphytic cacti, where they typically are utilising the tree structures as a permanent, communal home with other plant species. Each internode (part of the plant where each leaf connects with the next) of the cactus will send out sticky, aerial roots to anchor and adhere the plant to the growing surface. Once stability is achieved, the plants gradually grow and transform over time, moving slowly upwards towards the sunlight.

Every available space is used to its maximum potential in these productive rainforests, with the plant-laden trees giving an almost “dripping” appearance. Their branches and trunks serve as a home for epiphytic species, often being completely covered with various tropical cacti, ferns, orchids, bromeliads, aroids, mosses, Peperomia, and more. It is seldom, if ever, found rooted into the ground, and nearly always found growing epiphytically or as a lithophyte. However, over the course of many years, a mature plants’ roots will end up growing in many directions; this includes horizontally, vertically, as well as down, touching the ground and soil. A large plant, with roots extending down from the treetops, will gain additional nutrition from the soil, while remaining firmly anchored in place.

Cultivation
Hatiora salicornioides is grown as an ornamental plant. It requires some humidity, and is not frost-tolerant. Given these conditions, it has been successfully cultivated outside in Phoenix, Arizona. In climates with lower winter temperatures, it is cultivated in greenhouses or as a house plant. It is propagated by stem cuttings.

In the UK Hatiora salicornioides has gained the Royal Horticultural Society's Award of Garden Merit.

See also
Schlumbergera
Succulent

References

External links

plantoftheweek.org
cactiguide.com
TopTropicals.com

Rhipsalideae
Flora of Northeast Brazil
Flora of Southeast Brazil
Flora of South Brazil
Flora of the Atlantic Forest
Epiphytes
Garden plants of South America